The pencak silat competitions at the 2017 Southeast Asian Games in Kuala Lumpur took place at Kuala Lumpur Convention Centre.

Medal table

Medalists

Seni (artistic)

Tanding (match)

Men

Women

Notes

References

External links
  

2017 Southeast Asian Games events
2017